Ong Keng Yong  (born 6 January 1954) is a Singaporean diplomat who served as the 11th secretary-general of ASEAN between 2003 and 2007. He is currently the Executive Deputy Chairman of the S. Rajaratnam School of International Studies at the Nanyang Technological University.

Education
Ong graduated from the University of Singapore (now the National University of Singapore) in 1979 with a Bachelor of Laws with honours degree. He subsequently went on to complete a Master of Arts degree in Arab studies at Georgetown University.

Career
He joined the Ministry of Foreign Affairs (MFA) in 1979 and went on diplomatic postings to Saudi Arabia (1984–1988), Malaysia (1989–1991) and the United States (1991–1994). 

He was the spokesperson for the Ministry of Foreign Affairs between 1994 and 1996. From 1996 to 1998, he concurrently served as Singapore's High Commissioner to India and Singapore's Ambassador to Nepal. 

He concurrently held three positions between 1998 and 2002: Press Secretary to Prime Minister Goh Chok Tong; Chief Executive Director of the People's Association; and Deputy Secretary at the Ministry of Information, Communication and the Arts. He served as Director of the Institute of Policy Studies at the National University of Singapore (NUS) between 2008 and 2011. 

From 2011 to 2014, he served as Singapore's High Commissioner to Malaysia. Since 2015, Ong has been concurrently serving as Singapore's Ambassador to Iran—a role he served between 2009 and 2011, and Singapore's High Commissioner to Pakistan. He has also been serving as Chairman of the Singapore International Foundation since 2015. 

Ong is the chairperson of the Governing Board of the Human Rights Resource Centre at the University of Indonesia. He is also a board member of the International Rice Research Institute Fund Singapore and The Asia Foundation Singapore. Ong is in the Global Council of the New York-based Asia Society. Ong is also an Ambassador-at-Large at the Ministry of Foreign Affairs.

In 2017, Ong criticised fellow diplomat Kishore Mahbubani about his views that small states must always behave like small states. Warning that it is against Singapore's well-being if international relations are based purely on size, Ong posited that Singapore adopts a "friendly approach to states which want to be friendly with (Singapore)... (while remaining) particularly sensitive in managing foreign policy... But when necessary, Singapore has stood up to pressure from other states when its interests were at stake."

Awards
Ong had received several awards throughout his career. He was awarded the Public Administration Medal (Silver) in 1997, the Long Service Award in 2002 and the Meritorious Service Medal in 2008 by the Singapore Government. He also received the Medal of Friendship from Laos in 2007, and the Medal of Sahametrei from Cambodia in 2007.

References

1954 births
Living people
Singaporean diplomats
Georgetown University Graduate School of Arts and Sciences alumni
Singaporean people of Chinese descent
Secretaries-General of ASEAN
Ambassadors of Singapore to Iran
Ambassadors of Singapore to Nepal
High Commissioners of Singapore to India
Recipients of the Royal Order of Sahametrei
High Commissioners of Singapore to Pakistan